The Union Council of Ministers  is the principal executive organ of the Government of India, which functions as the senior decision making body of the executive branch. It is chaired by the prime minister and consists of the heads of each of the executive government ministries. Currently, the council is headed by prime minister Narendra Modi and consists of 29 members, including the prime minister. The council is subject to the Parliament of India.

A smaller executive body called the Union Cabinet  is the supreme decision-making body in India; it is a subset of the Union Council of Ministers who hold important portfolios and ministries of the government

Regulation 
Pursuant to Article 75(3), the Council of Ministers is responsible collectively to the lower house of the Indian parliament, called the Lok Sabha (House of the People). When a bill introduced by a minister in the Lok Sabha is not approved by it, the entire council of ministers is responsible and not the minister. The council of ministers upon losing the confidence of Lok Sabha shall resign to facilitate the formation of a new government.

A minister shall take any decision without being considered by the council of ministers per Article 78(c). All union cabinet members shall submit in writing to the President to propose a proclamation of emergency by the president in accordance with Article 352.

According to the Constitution of India, the total number of ministers in the council of ministers must not exceed 15% of the total number of members of the Lok Sabha. Ministers must be members of parliament. Any minister who is not a member of either of the houses of the parliament for six consecutive months is automatically stripped off his or her ministerial post.

Ranking
There are five categories of the council of ministers as given below, in descending order of rank:
 Prime Minister: Leader of the executive of the Government of India. 
 Deputy Prime Minister (if any): Presides as prime minister in his absence or as the senior most cabinet minister.
 Cabinet Minister: A member of the Union cabinet; leads a ministry.	
 Minister of State (Independent charge): Junior minister not reporting to a Cabinet Minister.
 Minister of State (MoS): Deputy Minister reporting to a Cabinet Minister, usually tasked with a specific responsibility in that ministry.

Appointment
Pursuant to Article 75, a minister who works at the pleasure of the president, is appointed by the President on the advice of the Prime Minister. Since at least the turn of the millennia, evidence indicates that an MP's electoral performance enhances the likelihood of being granted a ministerial portfolio.

Removal
 Upon death.
 Upon self resignation, or resignation or death of Prime Minister.
 Upon dismissal by the President for minister's unconstitutional acts per Article 75(2).
 Upon direction from the Judiciary for committing violation of law.
 Upon ceasing eligibility to be a member of Parliament.
 Under the provision of "Collective Responsibility" under Article 75, the Prime Minister and the entire Council of Ministers resign if a Vote of No Confidence is passed in the Lower House (Lok Sabha) of the Indian Parliament.

Council of Ministers in state governments
Every state in India is governed by its council of ministers with rules and procedures similar to the union council of ministers per Articles 163, 164 and 167(c).

In March 2020, the Supreme Court of India used its powers for the first time to do "complete justice" under Article 142 of the Indian Constitution to remove a minister functioning in the state of Manipur.

Current Union Council of Ministers 
 
Council portfolios are as follows:

Cabinet Ministers 

|colspan=7|

Ministers of State (Independent Charge)

Ministers of State

See also
 List of longest-serving members of the Union Council of Ministers of India
 Politics of India
 National Democratic Alliance
 Council of Ministers of Narendra Modi

References

External links

Union Council of Ministers at the National Portal of India
New Union Council of Ministers (Cabinet Reshuffle 2021) List at Full List of Ministers Who Resigned and Newly Appointed Ministers in Cabinet Reshuffle - Law Planet - Legal News, Law Updates & Law Exams Preparation

Parliament of India
 
 
India
Council of Ministers of India